The Surrey Women's cricket team is the women's representative cricket team for the English historic county of Surrey. They play their home games at various grounds across the county, including Reed's School Ground, Cobham, as well as The Oval and Woodbridge Road, Guildford. They are captained by Aylish Cranstone and coached by Jonathan Batty. In 2019, Surrey played in Division One of the final season of the Women's County Championship, and have since played in the Women's Twenty20 Cup. They are partnered with the regional side South East Stars.

History

1811–1996: Early History
Surrey Women played their first recorded match in 1811, against Hampshire Women. They went on to play various one-off matches, including regular games against Middlesex, as well as against touring sides such as Australia. Surrey joined the Women's Area Championship in 1980, and continued to play in the competition until it was discontinued, in 1996.

1997–present: Women's County Championship
Surrey Women joined the Women's County Championship in 1997, its inaugural season, finishing 3rd in Division One. After finishing 2nd in 1998, they battled relegation in subsequent seasons, before suffering two successive relegations in 2004 and 2005. Surrey bounced back with a rapid climb back up through the Divisions, winning Division 3 in 2006 and Division 2 in 2008. In 2009, they were again relegated from Division 1, but did find success in the first season of the Women's Twenty20 Cup, where they were crowned champions of Division 1. Surrey were unable to find further success in the Twenty20 Cup however, and soon became a regular lower-table Division 1 side in both competitions.

Since 2015, Surrey have also competed in the London Cup, in which they play a Twenty20 match against Middlesex. After losing the first five competitions, Surrey finally triumphed in 2020, winning the match by 4 wickets. The side also won the inaugural Women's London Championship in 2020. In 2021, they played in the South East Group of the Twenty20 Cup, finishing 2nd with 4 wins, as well as losing the London Cup to Middlesex by 8 wickets and finishing second to Kent in the London Championship. They finished bottom of their group in the 2022 Women's Twenty20 Cup, but regained their title in the Women's London Championship.

Players

Current squad
Based on appearances in 2022 season.  denotes players with international caps.

Notable players
Players who have played for Surrey and played internationally are listed below, in order of first international appearance (given in brackets):

 Mollie Child (1934)
 Molly Hide (1934)
 Myrtle Maclagan (1934)
 Dorothy McEvoy (1949)
 Grace Morgan (1949)
 Hazel Sanders (1949)
 Barbara Murrey (1951)
 Jean Cummins (1954)
 Helene Hegarty (1954)
 Joan Westbrook (1954)
 Edna Barker (1957)
 Shirley Driscoll (1957)
 Joan Hawes (1957)
 Josephine Batson (1958)
 Sheila Plant (1960)
 Sandra Brown (1963)
 Eileen Vigor (1963)
 Jacqueline Whitney (1966)
 Enid Bakewell (1968)
 Chris Watmough (1968)
 Geraldine Davies (1973)
 Jan Southgate (1976)
 Jan Brittin (1979)
 Margaret Peear (1979)
 Gill McConway (1982)
 Patsy Lovell (1987)
 Caroline Barrs (1988)
 Sandra Dawson (1993)
 Ruth Lupton (1995)
 Olivia Magno (1996)
 Melanie Jones (1997)
 Nicky Shaw (1999)
 Sarah Clarke (2001)
 Laura Joyce (2001)
 Ebony Rainford-Brent (2001)
 Emma Beamish (2003)
 Emma Sampson (2007)
 Rachel Candy (2007)
 Olivia Anderson (2008)
 Shakera Selman (2008)
 Marizanne Kapp (2009)
 Susie Rowe (2010)
 Lea Tahuhu (2011)
 Nat Sciver-Brunt (2013)
 Bryony Smith (2018)
 Priyanaz Chatterji (2018)
 Natasha Miles (2021)
 Alice Capsey (2022)

Seasons

Women's County Championship

Women's Twenty20 Cup

Honours
 County Championship:
 Division Two champions (1) – 2008
 Division Three champions (1) – 2006
 Women's Twenty20 Cup:
 Champions (1) – 2009

See also
 Surrey County Cricket Club
 South East Stars

Notes

References

Cricket in Surrey
Surrey County Cricket Club
Women's cricket teams in England